Sarayevsky District is an administrative and municipal district (raion), one of the twenty-five in Ryazan Oblast, Russia. It is located in the south of the oblast. Its administrative center is the urban locality (a work settlement) of Sarai. Population: 17,810 (2010 Census);  The population of Sarai accounts for 32.6% of the district's total population.

Notable residents 

Ivan Khabarov (1888–1960), Soviet Army Commander during World War II
Sergei Mosyagin (born 1937), Soviet football player and coach, born in what was then Mozharskiy District

References

Notes

Sources

Districts of Ryazan Oblast